Ali Abdi Feiruz, known as Ali Feiruz, was a prominent Somali musician. He belonged to the Habr Awal clan of the Isaaq clan family.

Biography
Feiruz was born in 1931 in Djibouti. He later moved to Hargeisa, Somaliland in the late 1950s, and then on to Mogadishu in 1973.

Feiruz's career began with Radio Hargeisa in the late 1950s. He was one of the first popular Somali kaban (oud) players in the 1950s, and eventually began incorporating modern instruments into his performances in the 1960s, such as the guitar, violin and accordion.

A prominent member of the Walaalaha Hargeisa and Hobolada Waaberi musical troupes, Feiruz composed, among other tunes, Ilaahayow waa kugu mahad, a tune whose release coincided with the independence of the former British Somaliland protectorate. As of 2012, this music still serves as the opening theme for the news segment of both Radio Mogadishu and Radio Hargeisa.

Feiruz had a significant influence on newer generations of Somali musicians in the 1960s and 1970s. He died in Djibouti in mid-1994.

See also
Waaberi
Abdullahi Qarshe
Music of Somalia

Notes

References
Fanka Ka Bixi-Maayo, Waxaanu Ku Abuuran Yahay Dhiigayga, Waanan La God-Gelayaa
Interview with the late Abdullahi Qarshe (1994) at the Residence of Obliqe Carton in Djibouti
"Magool: The Inimitable Nightingale of Somali Music," Bildhaan: An International Journal of Somali Studies: Vol. 14, Article 5.

1931 births
1994 deaths
Somalian musicians
Djiboutian emigrants to Somalia